Bill Potts may refer to:

 Bill Potts (musician) (1928–2005), American jazz pianist
 Bill Potts (lawyer),  criminal lawyer and past president of Queensland Law Society
 Bill Potts (American football), played in 1934 Pittsburgh Pirates (NFL) season
 Bill Potts (Doctor Who), a fictional character in the British television series Doctor Who

See also
 William Potts (disambiguation)